Jeff Wilbusch (born Iftach Wilbuschewitz, 14 November 1987) is an Israeli-German actor.

Early life and education
Wilbusch was born on 14 November 1987 in Haifa, Israel. He grew up in the Hasidic Jewish Satmar community of Mea Shearim, Jerusalem. Yiddish is his native language, and he is the eldest of 14 siblings. 

He studied economics, and, in 2011, obtained a master's degree in international economics from the University of Amsterdam. After finishing his graduate degree, he moved to Munich and studied theatre at the Otto Falckenberg School of the Performing Arts until 2015.

Career 
In 2018, he played the role of Anton Mesterbein in the BBC - AMC miniseries The Little Drummer Girl, and Noah Weisz in the German-Luxembourgian television series Bad Banks. In 2020, he portrayed Moishe Lefkovitch in the German-American Netflix original miniseries Unorthodox. In 2021, he portrayed Uri Savir in the HBO motion picture Oslo.

Personal life 
Wilbusch speaks five languages: English, Dutch, German, Hebrew, and Yiddish.

He lives in Los Angeles.

Filmography

Television

Film

Awards and nominations

References

External links

Living people
1987 births
21st-century German male actors
21st-century Israeli male actors
German male television actors
Israeli male television actors
Jewish German male actors
People from Haifa
University of Amsterdam alumni
Israeli emigrants to Germany
Yiddish film actors
German people of Israeli descent